This is a list of municipalities in Montenegro which have standing links to local communities in other countries known as "town twinning" (usually in Europe) or "sister cities" (usually in the rest of the world).

B
Bar

 Bor, Serbia
 Bornova, Turkey
 Corfu, Greece
 Hongkou (Shanghai), China
 Küçükkuyu (Ayvacık), Turkey
 Kula, Serbia
 Kursk, Russia
 Kragujevac, Serbia
 Mali Iđoš, Serbia
 Požarevac, Serbia

Berane

 Çiğli, Turkey
 Čukarica (Belgrade), Serbia
 Dudelange, Luxembourg

 Karaisalı, Turkey
 Kostromskoy District, Russia
 Peja, Kosovo
 Staro Nagoričane, North Macedonia

 Teramo, Italy
 Vrnjačka Banja, Serbia
 Zavidovići, Bosnia and Herzegovina

Bijelo Polje

 Bila Tserkva, Ukraine
 Burhaniye, Turkey
 Hrubieszów, Poland
 Maardu, Estonia
 Strumica, North Macedonia
 Svishtov, Bulgaria

Budva

 Banská Bystrica, Slovakia
 Bijeljina, Bosnia and Herzegovina
 Celje, Slovenia
 Čukarica (Belgrade), Serbia
 Eastern AO (Moscow), Russia
 Kamnik, Slovenia
 Laktaši, Bosnia and Herzegovina
 Makarska, Croatia
 Novi Sad, Serbia
 Ohrid, North Macedonia
 Pakrac, Croatia
 Petacciato, Italy
 Prague 4 (Prague), Czech Republic
 Stari Grad (Sarajevo), Bosnia and Herzegovina
 Valašské Meziříčí, Czech Republic
 Velika Plana, Serbia
 Vrnjačka Banja, Serbia
 West Palm Beach, United States
 Yalova, Turkey

C
Cetinje

 Alba Iulia, Romania
 Gaziantep, Turkey
 Kharkiv, Ukraine
 Kostroma, Russia
 Larnaca, Cyprus
 Mali Iđoš, Serbia
 Nafplio, Greece
 Novo Sarajevo (Sarajevo), Bosnia and Herzegovina
 Rijeka, Croatia
 Santa Severina, Italy
 Shkodër, Albania
 Sinaia, Romania
 Spoleto, Italy
 Velika Kladuša, Bosnia and Herzegovina
 Veliko Tarnovo, Bulgaria
 Vranje, Serbia
 West Achaea, Greece

D
Danilovgrad

 Crvenka (Kula), Serbia

 Grodzisk Mazowiecki, Poland
 Roosendaal, Netherlands
 Serpukhov, Russia

H
Herceg Novi

 Bačka Topola, Serbia

 Barletta, Italy
 Beočin, Serbia
 Čajetina, Serbia
 Kranj, Slovenia
 Mali Zvornik, Serbia
 Novo Mesto, Slovenia

 Prizren, Kosovo
 Vauréal, France
 Volgorechensk, Russia
 Zemun (Belgrade), Serbia

K
Kolašin

 Lovech, Bulgaria
 Prijepolje, Serbia
 Slovianoserbsk, Ukraine

Kotor

 Campomarino, Italy
 Gaziantep, Turkey
 Nesebar, Bulgaria
 Přerov, Czech Republic
 Santa Barbara, United States
 Stari Grad (Belgrade), Serbia
 Szeged, Hungary
 Trogir, Croatia
 Xi'an, China

N
Nikšić

 Arilje, Serbia
 Bileća, Bosnia and Herzegovina
 Chifeng, China
 Foča, Bosnia and Herzegovina
 Gacko, Bosnia and Herzegovina
 Koprivnica, Croatia
 Kumanovo, North Macedonia
 Lazarevac (Belgrade), Serbia
 Nevesinje, Bosnia and Herzegovina
 Trebinje, Bosnia and Herzegovina
 Vrbas, Serbia
 Želino, North Macedonia

P
Petnjica
 Rumelange, Luxembourg

Plav
 Deçan, Kosovo

Pljevlja

 Gračanica, Bosnia and Herzegovina
 Paraćin, Serbia
 Velenje, Slovenia

Plužine
 Kraljevo, Serbia

Podgorica

 Ankara, Turkey
 Bari, Italy
 Naousa, Greece
 Skopje, North Macedonia

R
Rožaje

 Bayrampaşa, Turkey
 Betton, France
 Kavadarci, North Macedonia
 Kütahya, Turkey
 Pfäffikon, Switzerland
 Pernik, Bulgaria

T
Tivat

 Aleksin, Russia
 Jiading (Shanghai), China
 Karpoš (Skopje), North Macedonia
 Konjic, Bosnia and Herzegovina
 Mola di Bari, Italy

 Piran, Slovenia
 San Giacomo degli Schiavoni, Italy
 Sremski Karlovci, Serbia
 Trogir, Croatia
 Ub, Serbia

Tuzi
 Rochester Hills, United States

U
Ulcinj

 Berat, Albania
 Deçan, Kosovo
 Durrës, Albania
 Liesing (Vienna), Austria
 Lukavac, Bosnia and Herzegovina
 Serik, Turkey

 Stari Grad (Sarajevo), Bosnia and Herzegovina
 Uzhhorod, Ukraine

References

Montenegro
Montenegro geography-related lists
Populated places in Montenegro
Foreign relations of Montenegro
Cities in Montenegro